Mesdag may refer to:
Taco Mesdag (1829–1902), Dutch banker and painter

Hendrik Willem Mesdag (1831–1915), Dutch marine painter
Museum Mesdag, in The Hague, Netherlands
Panorama Mesdag, a 1881 panorama
Sina Mesdag-van Houten (1834–1909), wife of Hendrik Willem Mesdag
Rob van Mesdag (1930–2018), Dutch Olympic rower
Jan Mesdag (1953–1988), Dutch singer